The 1928 Alabama Crimson Tide football team (variously "Alabama", "UA" or "Bama") represented the University of Alabama in the 1928 college football season. It was the Crimson Tide's 35th overall and 7th season as a member of the Southern Conference (SoCon). The team was led by head coach Wallace Wade, in his sixth year, and played their home games at Denny Field in Tuscaloosa, at Legion Field in Birmingham and at the Cramton Bowl in Montgomery, Alabama. They finished the season with a record of six wins and three losses (6–3 overall, 6–2 in the SoCon).

Game summaries
Alabama's October 20 meeting with Tennessee was the first game between the two schools in 14 years.  While the game had been played on irregular dates up until 1914, when the series was renewed in 1928 the game was scheduled for the Third Saturday in October.  Alabama and Tennessee have played yearly ever since, except when interrupted by World War II in 1943, although the game has more frequently been scheduled for the fourth Saturday in October since the SEC expanded to 12 teams in 1992.  Alabama lost this renewal of the series 15–13, victimized by poor special teams play (a 98-yard kickoff return for Tennessee to open the game, a safety on a fumbled punt, a missed extra point) and mistakes (an offsides penalty that kept a Tennessee drive alive, leading to its second touchdown).

Schedule

References
General

 

Specific

Alabama
Alabama Crimson Tide football seasons
Alabama Crimson Tide football